Hassam Uddin Qazi (4 March 1961 – 3 July 2004) was a Pakistani actor and is considered one of the most acclaimed artists of PTV. He started his acting career in the 1980s and remained a busy actor until his death in 2004, performing in PTV classic dramas in Urdu as well as Balochi and Brahvi plays and serials.

Early life and career 
Hassam Qazi was born in 1961 in Quetta, Pakistan and after his early education he did his Masters in Commerce from Quetta University. He joined the education field and was appointed as a college lecturer which he retained throughout his life.
Hassam Qazi was interested in acting and joined Pakistan Television Corporation as an actor in the 1980's. He made his debut through the drama Khali Hath, produced by Dost Muhammad Gishkori at PTV Quetta Center. Despite his job as a lecturer, he successfully managed his acting career and appeared in many dramas produced by Quetta, Karachi and Islamabad centers. He got recognition through his drama Chaon which was directed by Kazim Pasha. His other famous dramas include Marvi, Dard Key Rishtey, Dais Pardais, Mitti Ki Moorat, Silsiley, Lab e Darya, Kashkol, Gharana, Mehrab Khan, Chakar e Azam and  OOOSSS. Throughout his career, he won many awards.

Death 

In 2000, Hassam Uddin Qazi was diagnosed with heart disease, due to which he settled down in Karachi for the treatment along with his family. On 3 July 2004, he died due to cardiac arrest. His body was taken to Quetta, his hometown, for burial and was laid to rest at Railways housing society graveyard. His last play was Miti ki moorat.

References

External links 
 

1961 births
2004 deaths
Pakistani male television actors
People from Quetta